J2S is a software publisher based in Lille, France. J2S is specialized in software solutions for the e-Commerce, Press & Publishing, Graphic Arts and Communication industries. J2S designs applications to optimise the content management and publishing processes that range from data control and validation to content-driven or layout-driven pages generation: automate repetitive tasks, add features to production tools, manage multimedia content, collaborative production workflows. They provide software bricks that are assembled according to the project, as well as completely customised solutions.

History
Created in 1999, J2S is the Laureate of the French National Competition for innovative startups in 2000.

J2S Offering
 Industry Solutions
e-Commerce
Brand Communications
Agencies & Studios
 Software
Simple Workspace
Simple MOM
Simple Brief
Simple Localizer
Simple Review
Simple Placer
Simple Runner
J2S Module Editor
Simple Entitlement
Simple Fileview
Simple Webview

 Service
Lab
Project Management
Software reseller
Web hosting

References

External links
J2S. (n.d.). J2S corporate information

Software companies of France